Sahab Uddin Ahmed (born 12 March 1963 in Katarihara, Assam) is an All India United Democratic Front politician from Assam, India. He was elected in Assam Legislative Assembly election in 2016 from Jaleswar constituency.

References 

Living people
All India United Democratic Front politicians
People from Goalpara district
Assam MLAs 2016–2021
1963 births